Municipal elections were held in Siliguri on 12 February 2022 to elect members of the Siliguri Municipal Corporation.

The All India Trinamool Congress party won the election defeating CPI(M) led Left Front with an overwhelming majority. The sitting Mayor of Siliguri Ashok Bhattacharya lost his ward to TMC candidate Alam Khan by 482 votes. After the result, Goutam Deb became the new Mayor.

Schedule

Voter Statistics

Parties and alliances
Following is a list of political parties and alliances which contested in this election:

Candidates

Result

Party-wise Result

Ward-wise Result
The Ward-wise Results were announced by the West Bengal State Election Commission after the counting.

References

Siliguri
Siliguri
Local elections in West Bengal
S